Nec pluribus impar (literally: "Not unequal to many") is a Latin motto adopted by Louis XIV of France from 1658. It was often inscribed together with the symbol of the "Sun King": a head within rays of sunlight.

Meaning
While the motto relates to the allegory of the "Sun King", its precise meaning is obscure.  Philip F. Riley calls it "almost untranslatable". Historian Henri Martin called it "very pompous and, above all, obscure and perplexing". Louvois, Louis' War Secretary, interpreted it as seul contre tous — "alone against all"; lexicographer Pierre Larousse suggested au-dessus de tous (comme le soleil) — "above all (like the sun)".  John Martin says "[Louis'] matchless 
splendour was expressed by the motto Nec Pluribus Impar - not unequal to many 
suns.". Yves-Marie Bercé gives Suffisant (seul) a tant de choses ("Sufficient (alone) for so many things") or Tout lui est possible ("Everything is possible for him"), i.e., "not unequal to many [tasks]". Louis himself wrote:

Origin and use
The first use of the motto and symbol is usually given as the great Carrousel of 1662, in what is now the Place du Carrousel, to celebrate the birth of his son Louis, the Dauphin. However, the motto appeared as early as 1658 on a medal. Voltaire attributes the motto and emblem to Louis Douvrier, who derived them from a device of Philip II of Spain, of whom it was said the sun never set on his dominions. Polemicists in the Spanish Netherlands pointed out the unoriginal nature of the symbol. Louis XIV himself was not enamoured of them, but they proved popular with the public and so he tolerated them.

The motto and sun-king device appeared on many buildings, as well as on cannons. The classical de Vallière guns in particular bear the motto and the symbol, even for those founded long after Louis XIV's death.

Many of Louis' subordinates adopted emblems and mottos playing off those of the sovereign. César de Beaufort, Admiral of France, adopted a moon with motto Elle obéit au soleil et commande aux flots ("It obeys the sun and commands the waves"); Duc de Sully adopted a burning-mirror with motto Je brûle sous son regard ("I burn [under its gaze / at his command])".

It is the motto of Ribét Academy, a private preparatory school in Los Angeles, the 1st Foreign Cavalry Regiment of the 6th light armored brigade of the French Army and Muir College a public, English medium school for boys located in Uitenhage, South Africa.

It is also found on the coat of arms of Zvishavane in Zimbabwe.

See also 
Honneur et Fidélité

References

Louis XIV
Latin mottos
Latin political words and phrases